The 63rd Massachusetts General Court, consisting of the Massachusetts Senate and the Massachusetts House of Representatives, met in 1842 during the governorship of John Davis. Josiah Quincy Jr. served as president of the Senate and Thomas H. Kinnicutt served as speaker of the House.

Senators

Representatives

 Charles Francis Adams 
 Geo. T. Bigelow 
 Luther Blodgett
Friend H. Burt

See also
 27th United States Congress
 List of Massachusetts General Courts

References

External links
 
 

Political history of Massachusetts
Massachusetts legislative sessions
massachusetts
1842 in Massachusetts